Hafizabad (also Romanized as Ḩafīz̧ābād; also known as Feyẕābād, Afsābād, and Ḩafaz̧ābād) is a village in Miyan Khaf Rural District, in the Central District of Khaf County, Razavi Khorasan Province, Iran. At the 2006 census, its population was 230, in 45 families.

References 

Populated places in Khaf County